Verônica Martins Marques (born September 6, 1996 in Mogi das Cruzes) is a Brazilian  professional football  player. She plays as a striker in the Albanian  Premier League KFF Vllaznia Shkodër.

Career 
She started her career as a football player at a young age in the clubs of her city.

Mrs Martins Marques attended Mogi das Cruzes High School in Mogi das Cruzes.

She was scouted by the Women's Football Team of Monroe College in 2014.

In 2016, she decided to leave Monroe College to join the Women's football of Franklin Pierce University. She is graduated in 2018.

In January she decided to start her career as a professional woman footballer.

Youth career
She played her entire career in the biggest women's football club in her city before moving abroad in 2014.

 2006-2014: CA Mogi das Cruzes Feminino, Mogi das Cruzes (Brazil)
 2014-2016: Monroe College, New York City (US) 26 goals / 11 assists
 2016-2018: Franklin Pierce University, Rindge (US) 21 goals / 14 assists

Professional career
In 2019, she left the United States to begin her professional career in Brazil

 2019-2021: São José EC,São José dos Campos (Brazil) 15 goals / 5 assists
 2021-2022: Club Puebla Femenil,Puebla (Mexico) 16 goals / 6 assists ]
 2022: Maccabi Kishronot Hadera F.C. (Israel)
 2022-: KFF Vllaznia Shkodër (Albania) 8 goals / 3 assists

Personal life 
Mrs Martins Marques speaks fluently English , Portuguese  and Spanish

Honors 
 Best stryker of the club 2021-2022
 Best foreigner of the season 2021-2022

References 

Living people
1996 births
Brazilian women's footballers
Club Puebla players
Women's association footballers not categorized by position